M. W. (Jack) Beaman (February 18, 1924 – January 9, 1998), was an American politician from the state of Iowa.

Beaman was born February 18, 1924, in Hopeville, Clarke County, Iowa to William and Mary Beaman. He graduated from Murray High School in 1942. He was an Army veteran of World War II. He served as a Republican in the Iowa House of Representatives from 1987 to 1995. Beaman died January 9, 1998 in Des Moines, leaving behind three daughters and six grandchildren. He was interred in Hopeville Cemetery in Hopeville, Clarke County, Iowa.

References

1924 births
1998 deaths
People from Clarke County, Iowa
Republican Party members of the Iowa House of Representatives
20th-century American politicians